Events from the year 1917 in Denmark.

Incumbents
 Monarch – Christian X
 Prime minister – Carl Theodor Zahle

Events

Undated

 Sovereignty of the Danish West Indies was officially transferred from Denmark to the United States, after the Treaty of the Danish West Indies was ratified.

Såprts
 26 April  Silkeborg IF is founded.

Date unknown
 Kjøbenhavns Boldklub wins the  1916–17 Danish National Football Tournament by defeating Akademisk Boldklub 62 in the final.

Births

 14 June – Lise Nørgaard, writer (died 2023)
 27 November – Arne Sørensen, footballer (died 1977)

Deaths
 26 February  Hanna Hoffmann, sculptor and silversmith (born 1858)
 5 May – Hans Smidth, painter (born 1839)
 14 June – Vilhelm Herman Oluf Madsen, politician (born 1844)

References

 
Denmark
Years of the 20th century in Denmark
1910s in Denmark
Denmark